This is a list of the seasons played by FK Sutjeska from 1946, when the club first entered a top-tier national competition to the most recent seasons. The club's achievements in all major national competitions are listed. 
Because the fact that FK Sutjeska in period 1925-1941 participated in lower, not-national competitions, that period is not listed. In that time (before World War II) Sutjeska played once in the final of Montenegrin Football Championship (1922-1940).

Overall (1946-)
Most of their seasons in domestic competition, FK Sutjeska spent in First League (Yugoslav First League, First League of Serbia and Montenegro and Montenegrin First League). Also, the club played seasons in the Second League of SFR Yugoslavia and Serbia and Montenegro, and few seasons in Montenegrin Republic League.

Seasons in domestic competitions

Championship

Final placement by seasons
From 1946, FK Sutjeska played 77 seasons in domestic leagues of SFR Yugoslavia, FR Yugoslavia, Serbia and Montenegro and Montenegro. Below is a list of FK Sutjeska final placements by every single season.

Playoffs
At the end of ten seasons, FK Sutjeska played in the playoffs for placement in the First and Second League.

First League attendance
Below is the list of attendance at FK Sutjeska First League home games by every single season.

National Cup
FK Sutjeska participated in 54 seasons of national Cup competition, since 1948. During their history, Sutjeska played in Yugoslav Cup, FR Yugoslavia Cup and, since the 2006-07 season, in Montenegrin Cup.
Sutjeska played twice in the final of national cup (2006/07, 2016/17), with one title on season 2016/17. 

* - penalties

Seasons in European competitions
During the history, FK Sutjeska played in UEFA Champions League, UEFA Europa League, UEFA Europa Conference League and UEFA Intertoto Cup. Except participation in UEFA competitions, during the history Sutjeska played in the Balkans Cup.

UEFA competitions
FK Sutjeska debuted in European competitions at 2003, when they played in UEFA Intertoto Cup. After the Montenegrin independence, Sutjeska often played in UEFA competitions, with four seasons in the Champions League qualifiers.

Overall

Matches by season

Other competitions

Balkans Cup
FK Sutjeska played one season in the Balkans Cup, a regional competition for clubs from Yugoslavia, Albania, Bulgaria, Greece, Romania and Turkey.

Matches

Source:

See also
FK Sutjeska Nikšić
Montenegrin First League
Montenegrin clubs in Yugoslav football competitions (1946–2006)
Montenegrin Derby

References

seasons
Sutjeska Nikšić